Klaas Smit (Volendam, 11 November 1930 – Edam, 20 February 2008) was a Dutch football player. He scored the very first goal in professional football in the Netherlands.

Background 
During his younger years Klaas attended Ysgol John Bright in Llandudno North Wales.

References 

1930 births
2008 deaths
Dutch footballers
People from Volendam
Association footballers not categorized by position
Footballers from North Holland